Wildegg Castle is a small castle in the municipality of Möriken-Wildegg in the canton of Aargau in Switzerland.

See also
List of castles and fortresses in Switzerland

Literature 
 Hans Lehmann: Die Burg Wildegg und ihre Bewohner, Aarau 1922.
 Andres Furger und andere: Schloss Wildegg. Aussenstelle des Schweizerischen Landesmuseums, Braunschweig 1994 (Digitalisat).
 Sophie von Erlach: Kleine Burg-Chronik des Schlosses Wildegg der Sophie von Erlach, hrsg. und komm. von Andres Furger, Zürich 1994.
 Walter Merz (Hrsg.): Die Urkunden des Schlossarchivs Wildegg, Aarau 1931.
 Thomas Pauli, Stefan Hess: Schloss Wildegg: Neu unter Aargauer Flagge, in: Argovia 2011, S. 264–269.
 Dokumentation der Sanierung Domäne Schloss Wildegg 1999–2011, hrsg. vom Bundesamt für Bauten und Logistik BBL, Bern 2011 ISBN 978-3-905-782-14-1
 Christoph Reding, Felix Ackermann, Felix Müller: Schloss Wildegg. (Schweizerische Kunstführer, Nr. 926, Serie 93). Hrsg. Gesellschaft für Schweizerische Kunstgeschichte GSK. Bern 2013, ISBN 978-3-03797-099-7.

References

External links

Castles in Aargau